John Swett High School is located in Crockett, California, United States. It serves the communities of Crockett, Port Costa, Rodeo, and the Foxboro area of Hercules. It is named after John Swett, former California Superintendent of Public Instruction, elected in 1863. John Swett High School was established in 1927. The school remains in its original building complex, which was extensively renovated five years after original construction for seismic retrofitting at a cost of two-thirds of the original cost of the complex. John Swett High School is part of the John Swett Unified School District.

The school's Indian mascot was dropped by a vote of the School District Board in February 2015. Citing the Golden State Warriors as an example, the school mascot became the Warriors in February 2016. The school always was the Warriors but would go by Indians. The year books would say Warriors on the cover but sports teams would go by the Indians.

Clubs and organizations
Associated Student Body and Student Council 
California Scholarship Federation
Color Guard 
Marching Band

Notable alumni
Billie Joe Armstrong - musician, of the punk rock band Green Day (transferred after freshman year)
Eric the Midget (Eric Lynch) - television actor and recurring personality on the Howard Stern Show 
Floyd Peters - professional football player
Aldo Ray - film actor
John V. Robinson - writer and photographer; author of books Crockett, and Spanning the Strait: Building the Alfred Zampa Memorial Bridge
Jim Turner - professional football player (1959)

References

External links
Official website

High schools in Contra Costa County, California
Educational institutions established in 1927
Public high schools in California
1927 establishments in California